The 2021 Grand Prix Zagreb Open, was a wrestling event held in Zagreb, Croatia between 16 and 17 January 2021.

Team ranking

Medal table

Greco-Roman

Participating nations

147 competitors from 18 nations participated.
 (15)
 (4)
 (3)
 (11)
 (12)
 (2)
 (13)
 (10)
 (8)
 (4)
 (11)
 (2)
 (9)
 (10)
 (10)
 (10)
 (1)
 (12)

References 

Grand Prix Zagreb Open
Grand Prix Zagreb Open
International wrestling competitions hosted by Croatia
Sport in Zagreb
Wrestling in Croatia
Grand Prix Zagreb Open